The Australia cricket team toured India in September and October 2017 to play five One Day Internationals (ODIs) and three Twenty20 International (T20I) matches. The Board of Control for Cricket in India (BCCI) confirmed the full dates in September 2017. Ahead of the ODIs, Australia played a 50-over warm-up match against India's Board President XI, with Australia winning by 103 runs. India won the ODI series 4–1 and returned to the top of the ICC ODI Championship. In accordance with the International Cricket Council's (ICC) new playing conditions, the Decision Review System (DRS) was used for the first time in a T20I match in this series. The T20I series was drawn 1–1, with the third match called off due to a wet outfield.

Squads

Josh Hazlewood was ruled out of Australia's squad, after suffering an injury during the first Test against Bangladesh in August 2017. Kane Richardson was added to Australia's squad as a replacement for Hazlewood. Peter Handscomb was added Australia's ODI squad as a cover for Aaron Finch, who was struggling with a calf injury. Ashton Agar fractured a finger during the third ODI, therefore ruling him out of the rest of the series.

Shikhar Dhawan was not available for the first three ODIs, as he took leave to attend to his wife, who was unwell. After the third ODI, he was not named in India's squad for the final two ODI matches, with no replacement named. Ravindra Jadeja was added to India's ODI squad for the first three matches, as a replacement for Axar Patel who injured his ankle. Patel was included for the last two ODIs, replacing Jadeja.

Ahead of the T20I series, Australia rested Pat Cummins, due to his increased workload schedule. Andrew Tye was named as his replacement. While fielding during the fifth ODI, Steve Smith picked up a shoulder injury, and was sidelined for the T20I series, with Marcus Stoinis being called up as a replacement, and David Warner given the captaincy.

Tour match

One-day: India Board President XI vs Australia

ODI Series

1st ODI

2nd ODI

3rd ODI

4th ODI

5th ODI

T20I Series

1st T20I

2nd T20I

3rd T20I

References

External links
 Series home at ESPN Cricinfo

2017 in Australian cricket
2017 in Indian cricket
International cricket competitions in 2017–18
Australian cricket tours of India